Goffs is an unincorporated community in Ritchie County, in the U.S. state of West Virginia.

History
A post office called Goffs was established in 1861, and remained in operation until 1972. Thomas Goff, an early postmaster, gave the community his name.

References

Unincorporated communities in Ritchie County, West Virginia
Unincorporated communities in West Virginia